The West Franklin Street Historic District is a national historic district located at Richmond, Virginia. It is located along the northern boundary of the Fan district. The district encompasses 71 contributing buildings built between about 1870 and the 1920. It was originally developed as a primarily residential district with buildings in a variety of popular late-19th and early-20th century architectural styles including Greek Revival, Romanesque, Georgian Revival, Queen Anne, and Italianate.  Many of the dwellings have been converted to commercial use.  In addition, the district's private houses have been converted into multi-family housing and departmental offices for Virginia Commonwealth University. Notable buildings include Franklin Terrace, the Ritter-Hickock House, First Independent Church, Founder's Hall, the Raleigh Building, The Greyston Apartments, Gresham Court Apartments, and the Beth Ahabah Congregation Hall and Synagogue.

It was added to the National Register of Historic Places in 1972, with a boundary increase in 2009.

References

Historic districts on the National Register of Historic Places in Virginia
Queen Anne architecture in Virginia
Romanesque Revival architecture in Virginia
Buildings and structures in Richmond, Virginia
National Register of Historic Places in Richmond, Virginia
Virginia Commonwealth University